Sophia Fredskilde Othman-Andersen (born October 5, 1998), known professionally as Sophia Fredskild is a mixed Danish-Malaysian singer-songwriter and composer, best known for her musical work in the Pop-Ballad and Pop-Electronic genre with the singles "In Another Lifetime", "No Limit", and "Heartbreaks Not Gonna Break Me".

Early life 
Sophia Fredskild was born on October 5, 1998, in Copenhagen, Denmark to a Danish mother and a Malaysian father. In 2000, Fredskild and her family relocated to Kuala Lumpur, Malaysia, where she primarily grew up.

At the age of 10, Sophia knew she wanted to be a singer and later wrote her first song at age 13.

During her school years she joined the choir and took part in talent shows, later getting involved in theatre and musical productions outside of school including Bites Of Delights (Rhythm in Bronze), Seussical Jr The Musical (Enfiniti Academy) and Sinbad the Musical (KLPac).

After she completed her high school education in 2015, Fredskild pursued her singing and songwriting career full-time.

Career

2015–2016: Career beginnings 
From August 2015 to July 2016, Sophia sang at bars, weddings, and private functions around Kuala Lumpur to gain confidence in her live singing, where she sang cover songs in a wide array of genres such as Pop, Jazz, R&B and Country, by artists like Amy Winehouse, Norah Jones to more current artist like Ed Sheeran, Rihanna and Adele. During this time Sophia developed her singing style and versatility in singing a wide range of musical styles.

2016–2021 
In late 2016, Sophia started to seek opportunities to get her songs recorded professionally and she chanced upon a collaboration with Malaysian DJ, Songwriter, and Producer Cuurley aka Bo Amir, with whom she co-wrote the English song "Go" released in November 2017. The song in Pop EDM's genre ended up being influential in the direction of music Sophia would be creating in from then onwards. Fredskild also released a second English single "More Than You See" in February 2018, a collaboration with Russian DJ, Songwriter and Producer Alexey Dorokhov aka Dorox.

In October 2018, she released her first solo project, a Malay song "Menanti Cinta" followed with an English version "Waiting For Love" in November 2018. In early 2019 she released English and Malay singles "Forever Mine" and "Cinta Selamanya" along with music videos uploaded to her YouTube channel which have reached over a million views each.

In October 2019 Sophia collaborated once again with another EDM artist Starlyte, a Malaysian Producer on the song "No Limit", which garnered over 1 million streams on the popular streaming service Spotify. In February 2020 she released "Head In The Clouds" another solo project produced by American Producer, Asaa. In October 2020, she released "Keep Me In Your Heart", which reached over 1 million views on YouTube.

In February 2021 she released "Shine A Light", and in May 2021 "Heartbreaks Not Gonna Break Me", a pop ballad, which was produced by Danish Producer, Gustav Boje.

On August 27th, 2021, Sophia collaborated with Furo, a Caribbean-influenced DJ from Florida, USA on a Moombahton Tropical-Dance Pop song called "Back To Paradise" and on October 15th, 2021, Sophia released an EDM song called "Future So Bright" with Brazilian DJ Tutsss.

2021–present 
In November 2021, Sophia relocated to Denmark to further her music career. She released a Pop-Ballad single called 'In Another Lifetime" on May 20th 2022, which has since achieved over 1 million streams on Spotify and over a half million views on her YouTube channel to date.

Discography

References 

Living people
1998 births
Danish women singer-songwriters
Malaysian people of Danish descent